The 'Noire River (in French: rivière Noire) is a tributary of the west bank of the rivière du Moulin whose current flows on the west bank of the Chaudière River; the latter flowing northward to empty on the south shore of the St. Lawrence River. It flows in the municipality of Saint-Alfred, in the Robert-Cliche Regional County Municipality, in the administrative region of Chaudière-Appalaches, in Quebec, in Canada.

Geography 
The main neighboring watersheds of the Black River are:
 north side: ruisseau des Meules, Mathieu River, Bras Saint-Victor, Chaudière River;
 east side: Chaudière River, rivière du Moulin;
 south side: Lac Fortin outlet, Victor-Loubier branch, Breton stream, Fabrique stream, Pozer River;
 west side: Bras Saint-Victor, rivière du Cinq, Prévost-Gilbert River.

The Rivière Noire takes its source at the confluence of two streams in an agricultural zone in the municipality of Saint-Alfred.

From its source, the Black River flows on  divided into the following segments:
  north-east, up to the first rang road;
  north-east, crossing the rang Sainte-Marie road, to a country road;
  heading east, crossing a country road, to its confluence.

The Rivière Noire empties on the west bank of the rivière du Moulin in rang Saint-Alexandre-Sud, in the municipality of Saint-Alfred.

Toponymy 
The toponym Rivière Noire was formalized on February 18, 1977, at the Commission de toponymie du Québec.

See also 
 List of rivers of Quebec

References 

Rivers of Chaudière-Appalaches
Beauce-Centre Regional County Municipality